Giovan Battista Carpi (November 16, 1927 – March 8, 1999) was a prolific Italian comics artist, illustrator, and teacher from Genoa.

Carpi worked mainly for Disney comics, mostly on books featuring Donald Duck and Scrooge McDuck, although he occasionally drew Mickey Mouse as well. He created Paperinik with Guido Martina.

Early life
Carpi was born in Genoa and from a young age frequented the study of the artist Giacomo Picollo. He became a fumetti illustrator in 1945, when he published in the weekly Faville. He then began to publish a series "Sparagrosso, Cacciatore in Africa" for the children's magazine Lo Scolaro.

Two years later, he moved to Milan, where he got experience in animation at the  studio. He continued to illustrate children's comics for studies like De Agostini, Corticelli, Tipys, and Messaggerie Musicali and began, in 1951, to draw humor comics.

Disney parody artist
Carpi drew a popular series of "" for the Italian Disney comics magazine Topolino. As the German-language Duckipedia notes, "His love for historical fashions and costumes predisposed Carpi for Disney parodies of world literature, such as Paperino principe di Dunimarca, a parody of William Shakespeare's Hamlet, or Il mistero dei candelabri, a parody of Victor Hugo's Les Misérables."

Other popular parodies by Carpi include Guerra e Pace (1986, based upon War and peace by Leo Tolstoy), Paperino e il vento del Sud (1982, Gone with the Wind by Margaret Mitchell), Paperino e il giro del mondo in otto giorni (1962, Around the World in Eighty Days by Jules Verne), Paperin Caramba y Carmen Olè (1979, Carmen by Georges Bizet), Paolino Pocatesta e la bella Franceschina (1980, Inferno by Dante Alighieri), Topolino corriere dello Zar (1966, Michael Strogoff by Jules Verne), La metamorfosi di un papero (1991, The Metamorphosis by Franz Kafka).

Death
Carpi died in Genoa on March 8, 1999.

Awards
, 1994 , Rome
Honorary laurea in science education, 1997, University of Bologna

Selected works
, Arnoldo Mondadori Editore, 1978
Paperinik e il ritorno a Villa Rosa
Zio Paperone e la corona di luce
Paperino e il pianeta Esalion
Zio Paperone e la fattoria orbitale
Paperino e il mistero di Lucca, 1992

Reprints
In 2019, a volume in the Disney Masters book series from Fantagraphics Books titled Uncle Scrooge: King of the Golden River (ISBN ) was dedicated to Battista Carpi.

References

External links
 
 Giovan Battista Carpi at the Lambiek Comiclopedia

1927 births
1999 deaths
Artists from Genoa
Italian comics artists
Disney comics artists